Scincella potanini  is a species of skink found in China.

References

Scincella
Reptiles described in 1896
Taxa named by Albert Günther